Deutsche Bank Place is a  skyscraper in Sydney, New South Wales, Australia. It is located at 126 Phillip Street (corner of Hunter Street) in the north-eastern end of the central business district, across the road from Chifley Tower. Construction began in 2002 and was completed in 2005. The building's architect is Norman Foster of Foster and Partners.

Deutsche Bank is the primary tenant, occupying 7 floors and owning the naming rights. Other tenants include, Allens, Investa Property Group and New Chambers.

See also

 List of tallest buildings in Sydney
 List of tallest buildings in Australia

References

External links
 Deutsche Bank Place website
 Deutsche Bank Place on Emporis.com (General database of skyscrapers)

Skyscrapers in Sydney
Foster and Partners buildings
Office buildings completed in 2005
Bank buildings in New South Wales
Skyscraper office buildings in Australia
Office buildings in Sydney
Sydney central business district